The  'AM'  is a record company, headquartered in Athens, Greece, founded in 1987 by the family Markogiannis while later renamed  'Alpha Records' . The potential was great names of Greek song at times.

Overview
In September 1999, the AM acquired by the group Vardinoyannis and renamed Alpha Records. The last discs released as a record company AM in 1999.

Artists
The following artists belonged or belong to potential Alpha Records.

Stelios Kazantzidis (died)
Stamatis Gonidis
Katerina Stanisi
Angela Dimitriou
Dimitris Kontolazos
Christos Menidiatis
Labis Livieratos
Popi Maliotaki
Lefteris Pantazis
Giorgos Alkaios
Aggelos Dionysiou
Lena Papadopoulou
Chrispa
Tolis Voskopoulos
Zafeiris Melas
Mando
Nikos Karvelas
Antzy Samiou
Alekos Zazopoulos
Dimitris Kokotas
Pitsa Papadopoulou
Vasilis Terlegkas
Katy Livanou
Triantaphyllos
Eri Zora
Sabrina
Eudokia

References

External links
Official website

Record labels established in 1987
Greek record labels